Patricia Hamilton (born 27 April 1937 in Regina, Saskatchewan, Canada) is a Canadian actress, perhaps best known for playing Rachel Lynde in the television mini-series Anne of Green Gables, its sequels:  Anne of Green Gables: The Sequel, Anne of Green Gables: The Continuing Story, and Anne of Green Gables: A New Beginning, and several Anne of Green Gables related films (such as Road to Avonlea). 

She also provided the voice of the character for PBS' animated series Anne of Green Gables. She was nominated for a Gemini Award for Best Performance by an Actress in a Supporting Role in a Dramatic Series three times, winning in 1996.

Biography
Hamilton attended Pittsburgh's Carnegie Tech She was also part of Tarragon Theatre's inaugural season in 1971.

In November 2008, Hamilton starred in the Harold Green Jewish Theatre production of Kindertransport in Toronto.

Personal life
She was married to actor Leslie "Les" Carlson in 1967; their son Ben Carlson is a noted Canadian stage actor who regularly performs Shakespearean roles with the Stratford Festival. Les and Patricia eventually divorced.

Filmography

References

External links

1937 births
Living people
Canadian film actresses
Canadian stage actresses
Canadian television actresses
Canadian voice actresses
Carnegie Mellon University alumni
Best Supporting Actress in a Drama Series Canadian Screen Award winners